Padam Singh Dahiya is a Indian Politician belongs to Khanda village in Sonipat district. He was Member of 10th Vidhan Sabha Haryana Legislative Assembly in Sonipat from Indian National Lok Dal Party.

Political career

Dahiya entered in politics in 1990 and joined Indian National Lokdal party.

In January 2019, Padam Singh left INLD and joined Jannayak Janata Party in the presence of Deputy Chief Minister of Haryana Shri Dushyant Chautala. He is the President of Jannayak Janta Party in Sonipat district.

In March 2023, Dahiya left Jannayak Janata Party and joined Indian National Congress in the presence of Bhupinder Singh Hooda and Deepender Singh Hooda.

References 

1963 births
Living people
People from Sonipat district
Haryana MLAs 2000–2005
Indian National Lok Dal politicians